Echinopogon is a genus of grasses native to Australia, New Guinea, Indonesia, and New Zealand. They are known commonly as hedgehog grasses.

They are perennial grasses with bristly panicles.

 Species
 Echinopogon caespitosus - bushy hedgehog grass, tufted hedgehog grass - Queensland, New South Wales, Victoria
 Echinopogon cheelii - longflower hedgehog grass  - New South Wales, Victoria
 Echinopogon intermedius - erect hedgehog grass - Queensland, New South Wales
 Echinopogon mckiei - New South Wales
 Echinopogon nutans  - Queensland, New South Wales, New Guinea
 Echinopogon ovatus - forest hedgehog grass - New Guinea, Australia (all 6 states plus Norfolk Island), Lesser Sunda Islands, New Zealand (North + South + Chatham Islands)
 Echinopogon phleoides - Northern Tablelands of New South Wales

 formerly included
see Calamagrostis 
 Echinopogon gunnianus - Calamagrostis gunniana

References

External links 
 Grassbase - The World Online Grass Flora

Pooideae
Poaceae genera
Grasses of New Zealand
Flora of New Guinea
Poales of Australia